References

1960 television seasons
1961 television seasons